Velma is an unincorporated community in Christian County, Illinois, United States.

A post office was established in 1894, but discontinued shortly thereafter, in 1897.  The first postmaster, Hiram Shumway, named the hamlet for his daughter Velma.

References

Unincorporated communities in Christian County, Illinois
Unincorporated communities in Illinois